The 1927–28 Oklahoma Sooners men's basketball team represented the University of Oklahoma in college basketball during the 1927–28 NCAA men's basketball season. The Oklahoma Sooners men's basketball team were a member of the National Collegiate Athletic Association's (NCAA) former Missouri Valley Intercollegiate Athletic Association at that time.  The team posted an 18–0 overall record and an 18–0 conference record to finish first in the conference for head coach Hugh McDermott.

Schedule

|-
!colspan=9 style=| Regular season

References

Oklahoma Sooners men's basketball seasons
Oklahoma